Paroma Banerji is a Bengali singer and television anchor, well known for hosting the Bengali television show Rojgere Ginni.

Discography
 Ghore Pherar Gaan

Collaboration albums
Aabaar Bochhor Kuri Pore (1995)

Filmography 
 Playback singer
 Elar Char Adhyay (2012)
 Bhuter Bhabishyat (2012)
 Nouka Dubi (2011)
 Narak Guljar (2009)
 Chaturanga (2008)
 Khela (2008)

Television 
 ETV Bangla
 Rojgere Ginni
 Ebong Rituparno
 Sudhu Tomari Jonyo

 Zee Bangla
 Labonyer Sangsar

 Rupashi Bangla
 Sonay Sohaga

References

Notes

External links 
 
 

Living people
Year of birth missing (living people)
Place of birth missing (living people) 
21st-century Indian singers
21st-century Indian women singers
Bengali singers
Bengali television actresses
Indian women playback singers
Indian television actresses
Singers from West Bengal